The Balkh River or Balkhab, also known in its upper reaches as the Band-e Amir River, is a river in northern Afghanistan.

The river rises in the Band-e Amir lakes in Bamyan Province in the Hindu Kush.  In its upper reaches the river is known as the "Band-e Amir River" (Rud-e Band-e Amir).  The river flows west, then north, and terminates in irrigation canals in the area of the cities of Balkh and Mazar-e Sharif or in the desert.  In times of exceptional flood the river drains into the lowlands of Turkmenistan.  In ancient times the river terminated in a delta at the Amu Darya, but has not reached that river since irrigation canals were developed centuries ago.

References 

Landforms of Balkh Province
Rivers of Afghanistan